Wasp Junior may refer to one of two engines of the Pratt & Whitney Wasp series:
Pratt & Whitney R-985 Wasp Junior
Pratt & Whitney R-1535 Twin Wasp Junior